The Abbasi Hotel (formerly known as the "Shah Abbas Hotel",) is a hotel located in Isfahan, Iran.

The whole complex was built at the time of king Sultan Husayn of Safavid about 400 years ago. Formerly known as the Mothers Inn caravanserai, it was built as a caravanserai to provide lodging for travelers.

Upon the suggestion of French André Godard (1881–1965), an archaeologist, architect, and historian of French and Middle Eastern Art., the Cultural Heritage Organization of Isfahan and insurance company decided to proceed with the renovation of the caravansary.

The selected architect, Mehdi Ebrahimian, led the project to restore and reconstruct the caravanserai, committing to preserve the originality of the outward facade while renovating the caravansary's chambers and remodeling them into the hotel rooms.

The American expert on historical Persian art and architecture, Arthur Upham Pope, lauded the magnificence of the decoration of the new hotel, describing in detail works drawn from the different periods within Iran in a letter dated 1966.

The 1974 film And Then There Were None, starring Oliver Reed and Elke Sommer, was shot here.

References

External links

Hotels in Iran
Buildings and structures in Isfahan
Persian gardens in Iran